Hackerspace.gr ('hsgr') is a hackerspace in Athens, Greece, established in 2011. It operates as a cultural center, computer laboratory and meeting place (with free wireless access). Hackerspace.gr promotes creative coding and hardware hacking through its variety of activities. According to its website: "Hackerspace.gr is a physical space dedicated to creative code and hardware hacking, in Athens".

Vision
Hackerspace.gr vision is inspired by the Open Source philosophy. The main values, according to its vision page, are Excellence, Sharing, Consensus, and Do-ocracy. It is a self-funded community, through a membership fee, individual donations and supporters. Every year Hackerspace.gr publishes its annual financial balance titled "The cost of Hacking".

Events
It organizes workshops, lectures, entertainment and informational  events. The events calendar lists several events weekly. Furthermore, hackerspace.gr is open for visitors as long as any of the administrators are in the premises.

Projects
Hackerspace.gr is an incubator place for many projects. Currently there is an OpenROV Taskforce on Hackerspace.gr. Verese community, a project participating on Mozilla WebFWD, is hosting its regular meetings at Hackerspace.gr. Ardupad was also incubated at Hackerspace.gr. A USB drop is located in the central area of the hackerspace. A custom open hardware delta 3D printer design, Anadelta is developed to cover its members need for a large 3D printer.

Services 
Hackerspace provides several online services to its members, visitors, and the general public. In particular some of its members are running an instance of the etherpad lite collaborative editor, a diaspora pod  and a Jabber/XMPP service.

Mobile Hackerspace 
Hackerspace.gr usually deploys its geodesic dome in order to establish a mobile hackerspace when a large number of its members participate in events and venues that are away from its physical location providing tools, equipment and free of charge services for attendees.

Libre Space Foundation 
hackerspace.gr is utilized as the headquarters of Libre Space Foundation, an open space technologies non-profit, as its laboratory and main working space. Libre Space Foundation shares its testing and manufacturing equipment with hackerspace.gr's users and visitors.

Libre Space Foundation has deployed its first SatNOGS ground station on the rooftop of hackerspace.gr and has used its machine, and electronics facilities for the manufacture, integration and initial testing of UPSat the first open source satellite, and also the first satellite made in Greece.

References

External links 
 

Hackerspaces
Cultural centers
Culture in Athens
Computer clubs in Greece
DIY culture